Seerivarum Kaalai is a 2001 Indian Tamil-language masala film written and directed by Ramarajan. The film stars himself alongside Abitha of Sethu fame. The film also stars Manorama, Mansoor Ali Khan and Anandaraj.

Plot 
Kaalayan is a do-gooder with a helping hand living in a Puliangudi town. Kaalayan falls in love with his sister's friend Kamakshi who is tortured and harassed by her sister-in-law Nandini, while Kamakshi's mother and brother are helpless spectators. After the initial hesitation the timid Kamakshi also reciprocates Kaalayan's love. Nandini does not want Kamakshi to marry Kaalayan. The duo elopes and gets married. After a violent bashing up of Kaalayan and Kamakshi by Nandini's men, the doctors warn Kaalayan that Kamakshi's health would be endangered if she were to bear a child. But Kamakshi drugs Kaalayan and seduces him. She conceives, but there is nothing to worry. The doctors are proved wrong and she delivers twins. It is time for Kaalayan and the gang to hold up their two fingers in "victory" style.

Cast 
Ramarajan as Kaalai
Abitha as Kamakshi
Alex
Anandaraj as Police Inspector 
Senthil
S. S. Chandran
Manorama
Vichithra as Nandini
Master Haja Sheriff
Gundu Kalyanam
Pasi Sathya
Mansoor Ali Khan as Kamakshi's brother

Soundtrack 
The soundtrack was composed by Sirpy. The soundtrack was released under the Saregama label.

References

External links

2001 films
2000s Tamil-language films
Indian action drama films
Films scored by Sirpy
2001 action drama films
Films directed by Ramarajan